William Wood (18 February 1873 – 3 March 1956) was a British trade union leader.

Wood was born in Bolton, Lancashire. He left school at the age of 11, and began working half-time at a cotton mill.  He joined the Bolton and District Operative Cotton Spinners' Provincial Association, and began working for the union in 1905.  In 1914, he became its assistant secretary, then its secretary in 1920.

Wood became a magistrate in 1923, and was also involved with the Trustee Savings Bank, and sat on the executive of the United Textile Factory Workers Association.

In 1926, Wood was elected as vice-chairman of the Amalgamated Association of Operative Cotton Spinners, to which the Bolton Spinners were affiliated.  In 1936, he became its president, and was also elected for two years to the General Council of the Trades Union Congress.  However, in 1940, he was suffering with poor health, and decided to retire.

References

1873 births
1956 deaths
Presidents of the Amalgamated Association of Operative Cotton Spinners
Members of the General Council of the Trades Union Congress
People from Bolton